Max Clos (6 January 1925, Ludwigshafen – 9 March 2002) was a 20th-century French journalist and the former editor-in-chief of Le Figaro from 1975 to 1988.

Prizes 
1962 : Prix Albert-Londres

Bibliography 
1969: L'Année du singe
1970: La Revanche des deux vaincus : Allemagne-Japon (with Yves Cuau)

References

External links 
 Max Clos, journaliste et éditorialiste au « Figaro », est décédé on La Croix (11 March 2002)
 Max Clos on Who's Who?

20th-century French journalists
Albert Londres Prize recipients
1925 births
2002 deaths
People from Ludwigshafen
Chevaliers of the Légion d'honneur
Le Figaro people